Canada competed at the 2017 World Aquatics Championships in Budapest, Hungary from 14 July to 30 July.

Canada was scheduled to compete in all six disciplines and its team consisted of 84 athletes (31 men and 53 women). However, only 83 competed across five disciplines because high diver Lysanne Richard withdrew from competition.

Medalists

Competitors

| width=78% align=left valign=top |
The following is the list of number of competitors participating at the Championships per discipline.

Diving

Canada has entered 11 divers (five male and six female). Canada will compete in all events except the men's 10 metres synchronized platform and the team event.

Men

Women

Mixed

High diving

Canada qualified one female high diver. Lysanne Richard had to withdraw from the competition after sustaining a neck injury.

Open water swimming

Canada's open water swimming team was named on April 9, 2017. The team consists of six athletes (three men and three women).

Swimming

Canada's swimming team was named on April 9, 2017, after the conclusion of the Canadian Swimming trials in Victoria, British Columbia. A total of 26 swimmers (17 women and 9 men) were named to the team. To qualify for the team, an athlete had to place in the top two of their event and also meet the a standard time set by FINA. Notable absentees to the team include, 2015 World Championship bronze medalist Emily Overholt, multiple time 2015 Pan American Games medalists Santo Condorelli and multiple World and Olympic medalist Ryan Cochrane (who retired after the 2016 Summer Olympics).

Men

Women

Mixed

Synchronized swimming

Canada's synchronized swimming team consisted of 14 athletes (1 male and 13 female).

Women

Mixed

 Legend: (R) = Reserve Athlete

Water polo

Canada has qualified both a men's and women's teams. The roster of both teams (with each consisting of 13 athletes each) was announced on July 12, 2017.

Men's tournament

Canada's men's water polo team qualified for the World Championships with a silver medal performance at the 2017 UANA Cup in Couva, Trinidad and Tobago.

Team roster

Milan Radenovic
Gaelan Patterson
Aria Soleimani
Nicolas Constantin-Bicari
Matthew Halajian
Scott Robinson
Jérémie Blanchard
David Lapins
Dusan Radojcic
Reuel D'Souza
George Torakis
Devon Thumwood
Robin Randall

Group play

13th–16th place semifinals

15th place game

Women's tournament

Team roster

Jessica Gaudreault
Krystina Alogbo
Axelle Crevier
Emma Wright
Monika Eggens
Kyra Christmas
Joëlle Békhazi
Elyse Lemay-Lavoie
Hayley McKelvey
Christine Robinson
Kelly McKee
Shae Fournier
Ymane Hage

Group play

Playoffs

Quarterfinals

Semifinals

Third place game

References

Nations at the 2017 World Aquatics Championships
2017
World Aquatics Championships